The 2013 Waratah Cup was the 11th season of the Waratah Cup knockout competition, the main domestic cup competition in New South Wales.

The defending champions were National Premier Leagues NSW side Sutherland Sharks, who beat APIA Leichhardt Tigers 4–1 in the 2012 final. It was the second time Sutherland had won the title in their history. They entered the competition in Round 4 alongside all National Premier Leagues NSW teams, advancing all the way to the Grand Final and an eventual loss to APIA Leichhardt Tigers. A record 97 teams entered the competition.

The 2013 champions were APIA Leichhardt Tigers – their fourth title (including predecessor knockout cup competitions) – who beat Sutherland Sharks in the Cup final at Seymour Shaw Park, which was a rematch of the previous season's Grand Final after goals from Jason Oswell, Franco Parisi and Sean Symons.

Teams
97 teams entered the competition – a tournament record. The draw for the entire tournament was conducted prior to Round 1.

Round 1
A total of 58 teams competed.

Round 2
A total of 32 teams competed, 29 having won in Round 1 and three (Bondi, Randwick City and West Pymble) having received byes in Round 1.

Round 3
A total of 40 teams competed, 16 of which had progressed from Round 2 along with 24 clubs from the National Premier Leagues NSW 2 and NSW State League Division 1.

Round 4
A total of 32 teams competed, 20 of which had progressed from Round 3 along with 12 clubs from National Premier Leagues NSW.

Round of 16
Wollongong United were the lowest ranked team to qualify for this round. They were the only FNSW Grassroots team left in the competition.

Quarter-finals
Wollongong United were the lowest ranked team to qualify for this round. They were the only FNSW Grassroots team left in the competition.

Semi-finals
The lowest ranked team qualified for this round was St George. They are the only National Premier Leagues NSW 2 team in the Semi-finals.

Grand final

References

Waratah Cup
1